William Pickles may refer to:
 William Pickles (doctor)
 William Pickles (American Revolution)
 William Pickles (trade unionist)